Noorani Chehra is an upcoming Indian film, directed by Navaniat Singh. Nawazuddin Siddiqui and Nupur Sanon playing the lead roles. Carl Zohan,  Samaira Thakur ,  Sonnalli Seygall, Aasif Khan, Jassie Gill, Master Rasel playing supporting role.

Cast 
 Nawazuddin Siddiqui
 Nupur Sanon as Hiba
 Samaira Thakur as Rukhsar 
 Carl Zohan as Piku
 Sonnalli Seygall as Anam
 Aasif Khan as Zaheer
 Jassie Gill as Fazal
 Master Rasel as Samad

References

External links

Upcoming Indian films
2020s Hindi-language films